The Combat of Stockerau was a minor rearguard cavalry skirmish fought by elements of the cavalry of Austrian VI Korps of the Kaiserlich-königliche Hauptarmee under Ludwig von Wallmoden-Gimborn against a single Hessian Guard Chevauleger regiment, under the command of French General Jacob François Marulaz. The combat ended in favour of the Austrians.

Context
Following the French victory at the battle of Wagram two days before, the French IV Corps of the Armée d'Allemagne, under Marshal André Masséna was pursuing Johann von Klenau's VI Korps of the Kaiserlich-königliche Hauptarmee Hauptarmee. After a successful skirmish at Korneuburg on 7 July, Masséna was aware that the enemy was retreating towards Bohemia and continued his pursuit in that direction. Leading Masséna's Corps cavalry was General Marulaz, who led the way, at the head of the Hessian Garde-Chevauleger regiment, a total of three squadrons, with a complement of 150 men.

Battle
Arriving with these men at Stockerau, around 43 kilometers from Vienna, on 8 July, Marulaz was attacked by the Austrian hussars of Austrian VI Korps. At the battle of Wagram, Wallmoden's command included around 1,365 cavalrymen from the 7th Liechtenstein (8 squadrons, 712 men) and 8th Kienmayer Hussars (8 squadrons 563 men), but it is unclear how many of these men Wallmoden actually engaged at Stockerau. It is certain, however, that, following a brief series of cavalry engagements, the troops of Marulaz were broken, dispersed and the regiment was almost destroyed.

French military historian Alain Pigeard qualifies the cavalry combat at Stockerau as a "bloody setback" for the French under Marulaz.

Notes

References

External links
 

Conflicts in 1809
Battles of the Napoleonic Wars
Battles involving Austria
Battles of the War of the Fifth Coalition
1809 in the Austrian Empire
Battles involving France
1809 in France
July 1809 events
Austrian Empire–France relations